Krithi Shetty (born 21 September 2003) is an Indian actress who predominantly appears in Telugu films. She made her debut with the commercially successful film Uppena (2021).. She Has Won One Filmfare Award South and One SIIMA Award.

Early life
Krithi Shetty was born on 21 September 2003 in Mumbai, in a Tulu family hailing from Mangalore, Karnataka. Her father is a businessman and her mother is a fashion designer. She has two siblings, a brother and a sister. During her academics, she worked in commercial ads.

Shetty can speak her mother tongue Tulu, Hindi and English. She has learnt to speak Telugu and is learning Tamil for her film career.

Career
Following a brief appearance in the Hindi film Super 30, Shetty made her debut in a lead role at age of 17, with the Telugu film Uppena directed by Buchi Babu Sana and produced by Mythri Movie Makers and Sukumar Writings. Reviewing her performance, The Times of India Neeshitha Nyayapati wrote: "The debutants Vaisshnav and Krithi manage to pull off the intricacies of their characters well for the most part.
In 2021, she appeared in the Telugu film Shyam Singha Roy opposite Nani. In 2022, she appeared opposite Ram Pothineni in bilingual film The Warriorr directed by N. Lingusamy. The film received negative reviews from critics and was huge commercial failure. Her next release in the same year was Telugu film Macherla Niyojakavargam, directed by M. S. Rajashekhar Reddy. As of 2022, She had appeared in Aa Ammayi Gurinchi Meeku Cheppali directed by Mohana Krishna Indraganti, co-starring Sudheer Babu.

Filmography

Films

Awards and nominations

References

External links
 
 

Living people
Actresses in Telugu cinema
Actresses from Mumbai
Indian film actresses
21st-century Indian actresses
2003 births
Tulu people
Place of birth missing (living people)
Actresses in Hindi cinema
Filmfare Awards South winners